Dangerous Games is the third studio album by American heavy metal band Alcatrazz. It marked a drastic departure from the band's two previous albums with its heavily Japanese-influenced style. It was also the first and only appearance for new guitarist Danny Johnson who replaced Steve Vai after he left the band to join the David Lee Roth Band in 1986, and the last studio album that Alcatrazz had released for 34 years, until the release of Born Innocent in 2020.

Track listing
(Songwriters listed in parenthesis.)
Side one
"It's My Life" (Carl D'Erico, Roger Atkins) – 4:10
"Undercover" (Danny Johnson, Jimmy Waldo, Jo Eime, Graham Bonnet) – 3:41
"That Ain't Nothin'" (Johnson, Waldo, Eime, Bonnet, Gary Shea, Jan Uvena) – 3:53
"No Imagination" (Eime, Bonnet) – 3:16
"Ohayo Tokyo" (Eime, Bonnet) – 2:59

Side two
"Dangerous Games" (Johnson) – 3:26
"Blue Boar" (Johnson, Waldo, Eime, Bonnet) – 3:14
"Only One Woman" (Barry Gibb, Maurice Gibb, Robin Gibb) – 3:43 (The Marbles cover)
"The Witchwood" (Johnson, Waldo, Eime, Bonnet) – 4:00
"Double Man" (Johnson, Waldo, Eime, Bonnet, Shea, Uvena) – 4:30
"Night of the Shooting Star" (Eime, Bonnet) – 1:04

Personnel
Band members
Graham Bonnet – vocals, backing vocals
Danny Johnson – guitar, backing vocals
Jimmy Waldo – keyboards, backing vocals
Gary Shea – bass
Jan Uvena – drums, backing vocals

Additional musicians
Jay Davis – backing vocals
Jimmy Haslip – bass

Production
Richard Podolor – producer
Bill Cooper – engineer
Mike Reese – mastering
 Jo Eime - lyricist
Roy Kohara – art direction 
Wendy Dio, Niji Management Inc. – management

References

1986 albums
Alcatrazz albums
Albums produced by Richard Podolor
Capitol Records albums